Carnival III: The Fall and Rise of a Refugee is the eighth studio-album by Haitian singer-songwriter and rapper Wyclef Jean. It was released on September 15, 2017.

Personnel
Carnival III: The Fall and Rise of a Refugee was Jean's first album recorded without his longtime co-producer Jerry Duplessis. Instead tracks were produced by Jean and several relatively unknown co-producers. Similarly, unlike previous Wyclef Jean albums, there were few high-profile appearances: the best known featured artistes were Lunchmoney Lewis and Emeli Sande.

Singles
On June 22, 2017, Jean released the first single from the album, titled "Fela Kuti", along with another song, titled "What Happened to Love". On July 14, 2017, Wyclef released the "Fela Kuti" official lyric video.

Critical reception
Mai Perkins of Pop Magazine wrote in a positive review, "Carnival 3 is right on time. Wyclef’s songwriting is ripe with empowerment and resilience. The album is a concise 12-track body of work with a handful of features and tributes to the likes of Fela Kuti as well as to the hallmarks of hip-hop." Mr. Wavvy of Cult MTL offered a negative critique, describing the album as "a cheap nostalgia cash-in".

Promotion

On December 25, 2017, Jean announced The Carnival Tour on social media. It started on February 9, 2018, and ended on October 26, 2018, after 56 shows.

Track listing

Notes
 [a] signifies a co-producer.

Charts

References

2017 albums
Albums produced by Jerry Duplessis
Albums produced by Wyclef Jean
Sequel albums
Wyclef Jean albums